PS-29 Khairpur-IV is a constituency of the Provincial Assembly of Sindh.

General elections 2013

General elections 2008

See also
 PS-28 Khairpur-III
 PS-30 Khairpur-V

References

External links
 Election commission Pakistan's official website
 Awazoday.com check result
 Official Website of Government of Sindh

Constituencies of Sindh